The Delaney Park Strip is an 11-block park in the Municipality of Anchorage, Alaska.  Originally a firebreak, the Park Strip would become Anchorage's first airfield.

History
Known to the Anchorage community as the Park Strip, Delaney Park is the oldest park in the city. It was established as part of the original Anchorage township plat in 1917 and named for James Delaney, one of the first mayors of Anchorage.

The park was originally used simply as a firebreak, but in 1923 it became “The Golf Course.” The community used the space both for a golf course and an airstrip. 

Anchorage residents, working for free, had prepared a 300 by 2000 foot landing field for Noel Wien to fly Jimmy Rodebaugh's newly arrived Standard J-1.  Wien's first flight took place on 4 June 1924, and by the end of the month had flown 170 passengers, two at a time in the front cockpit, on a 15 minute ride.  These were the first passenger flights from Anchorage.  Wien also started the first flight between Anchorage and Fairbanks from the strip on 6 July. 

In 1932, however, Merrill Field opened, so the Delaney Park airstrip was no longer necessary.

In 1954 the Parks & Recreation Department began to develop recreation facilities for a variety of activities and events, including ice skating, softball, horseshoes, and, later, tennis. In 1958 the Park Strip hosted the Alaska Statehood Celebration.

On the 75th anniversary of Noel Wien's historic flight to Fairbanks, his two sons Noel Merrill and Richard, reenacted the flight using a Boeing Stearman, after receiving FAA permission to take off from the park.

Presently, the park is used for a variety of community events, sports, and festivals year-round.

Facilities

 Two soccer fields
 Six softball fields
 Eight tennis courts
 Two sand volleyball courts
 Five horseshoe pits
 Ice hockey rink and ice skating area
 Winter running route around the park
 Fitness center at Pete’s Gym
 Memorial to Pope John Paul II, who visited the Park Strip in 1981
 Martin Luther King, Jr. Memorial
 Victims for Justice Tree
 Purple Heart Memorial
 Aviation Memorial
 E.G. Fenn Memorial
 POW/MIA Tree
 Organ and Tissue Donor Memorial
 C.A. Berg Tree
 R.O. Robertson Tree
 Veterans' Memorial
 Bandstand
 Centennial Rose Garden
 Parking spaces available along 10th Avenue on the park side

Reference

External links

Protected areas of Anchorage, Alaska
Parks in Alaska
Ice hockey venues in Alaska
Soccer venues in Alaska
Softball venues in the United States
Tennis venues in the United States
Volleyball venues in Alaska